Lou Andreas-Salomé (born either Louise von Salomé or Luíza Gustavovna Salomé or Lioulia von Salomé, ; 12 February 1861 – 5 February 1937) was a Russian-born psychoanalyst and a well-traveled author, narrator, and essayist from a French Huguenot-German family. Her diverse intellectual interests led to friendships with a broad array of distinguished thinkers, including Friedrich Nietzsche, Sigmund Freud, Paul Rée, and Rainer Maria Rilke.

Life

Early years
Lou Salomé was born in St. Petersburg to Gustav Ludwig von Salomé (1807–1878), and Louise von Salomé (née Wilm) (1823–1913). Lou was their only daughter; they had five sons. Although she would later be attacked by the Nazis as a "Finnish Jew", her parents were actually of French Huguenot and Northern German descent. The youngest of six children, she grew up in a wealthy and well-cultured household, with all children learning Russian, German, and French; Salomé was allowed to attend her brothers' classes.

Born into a strictly Protestant family, Salomé grew to resent the Reformed church and Hermann Dalton, the Orthodox Protestant pastor. She refused to be confirmed by Dalton, officially left the church at age 16, but remained interested in intellectual pursuits in the areas of philosophy, literature and religion.

In fact, she was fascinated by the sermons of the Dutch pastor Hendrik Gillot, known in St. Petersburg as an opponent of Dalton's. Gillot, 25 years her senior, took her on as a student, engaging with her in the fields of theology, philosophy, world religions, and French and German literature. Together they studied innumerable authors, philosophers, theological and religious subjects, and all of this wide-ranging study laid the groundwork for her intellectual encounters with very well-known thinkers of her time. Gillot became so smitten with Salomé that he wanted to divorce his wife and marry his young student. Salomé refused, for she was not interested in marriage and sexual relations.  Though disappointed and shocked by this development, she remained friends with Gillot.

Following her father's death in 1879, Salomé and her mother went to Zürich so Salomé could acquire a university education as a "guest student." In her one year at the University of Zurich—one of the few schools that accepted female students—Salomé attended lectures in philosophy (logic, history of philosophy, ancient philosophy, and psychology) and theology (dogmatics). During this time, Salomé's physical health was failing due to lung disease, causing her to cough up blood. Due to this, she was instructed to heal in warmer climates, so in February 1882, Salomé and her mother went to Rome.

Rée and Nietzsche, and later life
Salomé's mother took her to Rome when Salomé was 21. At a literary salon in the city, Salomé became acquainted with the author Paul Rée. Rée proposed to her, but she instead suggested that they live and study together as 'brother and sister' along with another man for company, and thereby establish an academic commune. Rée accepted the idea, and suggested that they be joined by his friend Friedrich Nietzsche. The two met Nietzsche in Rome in April 1882, and Nietzsche is believed to have instantly fallen in love with Salomé, as Rée had earlier done.  Nietzsche asked Rée to propose marriage to Salomé on his behalf, which she rejected. She had been interested in Nietzsche as a friend, but not as a husband. Nietzsche nonetheless was content to join Rée and Salomé touring through Switzerland and Italy together, planning their commune. On 13 May, in Lucerne, when Nietzsche was alone with Salomé, he earnestly proposed marriage to her again, and she again rejected him. He was happy to continue with the plans for an academic commune. After discovering the situation, Nietzsche's sister Elisabeth became determined to get Nietzsche away from what she described as the "immoral woman". The three travelled with Salomé's mother through Italy and considered where they would set up their "Winterplan" commune.  This commune was intended to be set up in an abandoned monastery, but as no suitable location was found, the plan was abandoned.

After arriving in Leipzig in October 1882, the three spent a number of weeks together. However, the following month Rée and Salomé parted company with Nietzsche, leaving for Stibbe without any plans to meet again. Nietzsche soon fell into a period of mental anguish, although he continued to write to Rée, asking him, "We shall see one another from time to time, won't we?" In later recriminations, Nietzsche would blame the failure in his attempts to woo Salomé both on Salomé, Rée, and on the intrigues of his sister (who had written letters to the families of Salomé and Rée to disrupt their plans for the commune). Nietzsche wrote of the affair in 1883 that he felt "genuine hatred for [his] sister".

Salomé would later (1894) write a study, Friedrich Nietzsche in seinen Werken (Friedrich Nietzsche in his Works), of Nietzsche's personality and philosophy.

In 1884 Salomé became acquainted with Helene von Druskowitz, the second woman to receive a philosophy doctorate in Zurich. It was also rumoured that Salomé later had a romantic relationship with Sigmund Freud.

Marriage and relationships 
Salomé and Rée moved to Berlin and lived together until a few years before her celibate marriage to linguistics scholar Friedrich Carl Andreas. Despite her opposition to marriage and her open relationships with other men, Salomé and Andreas remained married from 1887 until his death in 1930.

Salomé's co-habitation with Andreas caused the despairing Rée to fade from Salomé's life despite her assurances. Throughout her married life, she engaged in affairs and/or correspondence with the German journalist and politician Georg Ledebour, the Austrian poet Rainer Maria Rilke, about whom she wrote an analytical memoir, and the psychoanalysts Sigmund Freud and Victor Tausk, among others. Accounts of many of these are given in her volume Lebensrückblick. Her relationship with Freud was still quite intellectual despite gossip about their romantic involvement. In one letter Freud commends Salomé's deep understanding of people so much that he believed she understood people better than they understood themselves. The two often exchanged letters.

Meeting Rilke 
In May 1897, in Munich, she met Rilke, who had been introduced to her by Jacob Wassermann. She was 37 while Rilke was only 21. She had already published with some success Im Kampf um Gott "where she exposed the problem of loss of faith (which had been her own for a long time)", several articles, and the study Jesus der Jude that Rilke had read.

As Philippe Jaccottet reports, Salomé wrote in Lebensrückblick: "I was your wife for years because you were the first reality, where man and body are indistinguishable from each other, an indisputable fact of life itself. I could have said literally what you told me when you confessed your love to me: Only you are real. That is how we became husband and wife even before we became friends, not by choice, but by this unfathomable marriage [...] We were brother and sister, but as in a distant past, before the marriage between brother and sister became sacrilegious".

In 1899 with her husband Friedrich-Carl, then again in 1900, Lou travelled to Russia, the second time with Rilke, whose first name she changed from René to Rainer. She taught him Russian, to read Tolstoy (whom he would later meet) and Pushkin. She introduced him to patrons and other people in the arts, remaining Rilke's advisor, confidante, and muse throughout his adult life. The romance between the poet and Lou lasted three years, then turned into a friendship, which would continue until Rilke's death, as evidenced by their correspondence. In 1937, Freud said of Salomé's relationship with Rilke: "she was both the muse and the attentive mother of the great poet".

Death

By 1930, Salomé was increasingly weak, suffered from a heart condition and diabetes, and had to be treated several times in the hospital. Her husband visited her daily during a six-week stay after a foot operation, which was arduous for the old, rather ill man, and this made them grow very close after a forty-year marriage marked by hurtful behaviour on both sides and long periods of non-communication. Freud appreciated this from afar, writing: "only what is true proves itself so long-lasting" ("So dauerhaft beweist sich doch nur das Echte."). Friedrich Carl Andreas died of cancer in 1930, and Salomé herself underwent a difficult cancer operation in 1935. At the age of 74, she ceased to work as a psychoanalyst.

On the evening of 5 February 1937, Salomé died in her sleep due to uremia in Göttingen. Her urn was laid to rest in her husband's grave in the cemetery on the Groner Landstraße in Göttingen. She is commemorated in the city by a memorial plaque outside the property where her house stood, a street named after her (Lou-Andreas-Salomé-Weg), and the name of the Lou Andreas-Salomé Institut für Psychoanalyse und Psychotherapie. A few days before her death, the Gestapo confiscated her library (according to other sources it was an SA group who destroyed the library shortly after her death). The reasons given for this confiscation were that she had been a colleague of Sigmund Freud's, had practised "a Jewish science", and owned many books by Jewish authors.

Work

Salomé was a prolific writer who wrote fiction, criticism and essays on religion, philosophy, sexuality and psychology. A uniform edition of her works is being published in Germany by MedienEdition Welsch. She authored a "Hymn to Life" that so deeply impressed Nietzsche that he was moved to set it to music. Salomé's literary and analytical studies became such a vogue in Göttingen, where she lived late in her life, that the Gestapo waited until shortly after her death to "clean" her library of works by Jews.

She was one of the first female psychoanalysts and one of the first women to write psychoanalytically on female sexuality, before Helene Deutsch, for instance in her essay on the anal-erotic (1916), an essay admired by Freud. However, she had written about the psychology of female sexuality before she ever met Freud, in her book Die Erotik (1911).

She wrote more than a dozen novels and novellas, including Im Kampf um Gott, Ruth, Rodinka, Ma, Fenitschka – eine Ausschweifung, as well as non-fiction studies such as Henrik Ibsens Frauengestalten (1892), a study of Ibsen's female characters, and a book on Nietzsche, Friedrich Nietzsche in seinen Werken (1894). The first English translation of her novel Das Haus (1921) appeared in 2021 under the title Anneliese's House, in an annotated edition by Frank Beck and Raleigh Whitinger.

Salomé edited a memoir about Rilke after his death in 1926. Among her works is also her Lebensrückblick, which she wrote during her last years based on memories of her life as a free woman. In her memoirs, first published in their original German in 1951, she goes into depth about her faith and her relationships.

Salomé is said to have remarked in her last days, "I have really done nothing but work all my life, work ... why?" And in her last hours, as if talking to herself, she is reported to have said, "If I let my thoughts roam I find no one. The best, after all, is death."

Published works
Lou Andreas-Salomé's published works as cited by An Encyclopedia of Continental Women Writers.

Im Kampf um Gott, 1885.
Henrik Ibsens Frau-Gestalten, 1892.
Friedrich Nietzsche in seinen Werken, 1894.
Ruth, 1895, 1897.
Fenitshcka. Eine Ausschweifung, 1898,1983.
Menschenkinder, 1899.
Aus fremder Seele, 1901.
Ma, 1901.
Im Zwischenland, 1902.
Die Erotik, 1910.
Drei Briefe an einen Knaben, 1917.
Das Haus, 1919,1927.
Die Stunde ohne Gott und andere Kindergeschichten, 1921.
Der Teufel und seine Grossmutter, 1922.
Rodinka, 1923.
Rainer Maria Rilke, 1928.
Mein Dank an Freud: Offener Brief an Professor Freud zu seinem 75 Geburtstag, 1931.
Lebensrückblick. Grundriss einiger Lebenserinnerungen, ed. E. Pfeiffer, 1951, 1968.
Rainer Maria Rilke – Lou Andreas-Salomé. Briefwechsel, ed. E. Pfeiffer, 1952.
In der Schule bei Freud, ed. E. Pfeiffer, 1958.
Sigmund Freud – Lou Andreas-Salomé. Briefwechsel, ed. E. Pfeiffer, 1966.
Friedrich Nietzsche, Paul Rée, Lou von Salomé: Die Dokumente ihrer Begegnung, ed. E. Pfeiffer, 1970.

Translations:
The Freud Journal of Lou Andreas-Salomé, tr. Stanley Leavy, 1964.
Sigmund Freud and Lou Andreas-Salomé, Letters, tr. byu W. and E. Robson Scott, 1972.
Ibsen's Heroines, ed., tr., and introd. by Siegfried Mandel, 1985.
Anneliese's House, edited and translated by Frank Beck and Raleigh Whitinger. Boydell and Brewer, 2021.

In fiction and film
Fictional accounts of Salomé's relationship with Nietzsche occur in four novels: Irvin Yalom's When Nietzsche Wept, Lance Olsen's Nietzsche's Kisses, Beatriz Rivas', La hora sin diosas (The time without goddesses). and William Bayer's The Luzern Photograph, in which two reenactments of the famous image of her with Nietzsche and Rée impact a murder in contemporary Oakland, California.

Mexican playwright Sabina Berman includes Lou Andreas-Salomé as a character in her 2000 play Feliz nuevo siglo, Doktor Freud (Freud Skating).

Salomé is also fictionalized in Angela von der Lippe's The Truth about Lou, in Brenda Webster's Vienna Triangle, in Clare Morgan's A Book for All and None, in Robert Langs' two-act play Freud's Bird of Prey, and in Araceli Bruch's five-act play Re-Call (written in Catalan).

In Liliana Cavani's movie Al di la' del bene e del male (Beyond Good and Evil) Salome is played by Dominique Sanda. The film was released in New York City and Los Angeles in April 2018, with a wider release to follow.

Notes

References

 Astor, Dorian: Lou Andreas-Salomé, Gallimard, folio biographies, 2008; 
 Binion, R., Frau Lou: Nietzsche's Wayward Disciple, foreword by Walter Kaufmann, Princeton, Princeton University Press, 1968
 Freud, S. and Lou Andreas-Salome: Letters, New York: Norton, 1985
Jaccottet, Philippe, Rilke par lui-même, Paris, Seuil, coll. " Ecrivains de toujours ", 1970, " Naissance de Rainer-Maria ", p. 29–37
 Livingstone, Angela: (1984). Lou Andreas Salomé: Her Life and Work. London: Gordon Fraser, 1984; 
 Michaud, Stéphane: Lou Andreas-Salomé. L'alliée de la vie. Seuil, Paris 2000; 
 Pechota Vuilleumier, Cornelia: '''O Vater, laß uns ziehn!' Literarische Vater-Töchter um 1900. Gabriele Reuter, Hedwig Dohm, Lou Andreas- Salomé. Olms, Hildesheim 2005; 	
 Pechota Vuilleumier, Cornelia: Heim und Unheimlichkeit bei Rainer Maria Rilke und Lou Andreas-Salomé. Literarische Wechselwirkungen. Olms, Hildesheim 2010; 	
 Peters, H. F., My Sister, My Spouse: A Biography of Lou Andreas-Salome, New York: Norton, 1962
Roudinesco, Elisabeth et Michel Plon, Dictionnaire de la psychanalyse, Paris, Fayard, coll. " La Pochothèque ", 2011 (1re éd. 1997), " Andreas-Salomé Lou, née Liola (Louise) von Salomé (1861–1937). Femme de lettres et psychanalyste allemande ", p. 63–68
 Salomé, Lou: The Freud Journal, Texas Bookman, 1996
 Salomé, Lou: Friedrich Nietzsche in seinen Werken, 1894; Eng., Nietzsche, tr. and ed. Siegfried Mandel, Champaign, Illinois: University of Illinois Press Univ. of Illinois Press, 2001
 Salomé, Lou: You Alone Are Real to Me: Remembering Rainer Maria Rilke, tr. Angela von der Lippe, Rochester: BOA Editions, 2003
Stieg, Gerald: « Rilke (Rainer Maria) », in Dictionnaire du monde germanique , Dir: É. Décultot, M. Espagne et J. Le Rider, Paris, Bayard, 2007, p. 979–980
 Vollmann, William T., Friedrich Nietzsche: The Constructive Nihilist, The New York Times, 14 August 2005.
 Vickers, Julia: Lou von Salome: A Biography of the Woman who Inspired Freud, Nietzsche and Rilke. McFarland 2008

External links

 
 
 Friedrich Nietzsche in seinen Werken, Wien, Verlag von Carl Konegen, 1894.
 Friedrich Nietzsche in seinen Werken, Wien, Verlagsbuchhandlung Carl Konegen, 1911.
 Articles on Lou Andreas-Salomé in the Encyclopedia of World Biography, the Encyclopedia of Modern Europe, and the International Dictionary of Psychoanalysis
 Lou Andreas-Salomé by Paul B. Goodwin in Women in World History: A Biographical Encyclopedia
 Lou Andreas-Salomé by Petri Liukkonen

1861 births
1937 deaths
19th-century writers from the Russian Empire
20th-century Russian writers
19th-century women writers from the Russian Empire
20th-century Russian women writers
Women writers from the Russian Empire
German women writers
German psychoanalysts
Russian people of French descent
Russian people of German descent
Russian people of Danish descent
German people of Russian descent
Writers from Saint Petersburg
Analysands of Sigmund Freud